The Braille pattern dots-245 is a 6-dot braille cell with the top right and both middle dots raised, or an 8-dot braille cell with the top right and both upper-middle dots raised. It is represented by the Unicode code point U+281a, and in Braille ASCII with J.

Unified Braille

In unified international braille, the braille pattern dots-245 is used to represent a voiced palatal affricate, fricative, or approximant, such as /dʑ/, /ʑ/ or /j/, and is otherwise assigned as needed. It is also used for the number 0.

Table of unified braille values

Other braille

Plus dots 7 and 8

Related to Braille pattern dots-245 are Braille patterns 2457, 2458, and 24578, which are used in 8-dot braille systems, such as Gardner-Salinas and Luxembourgish Braille.

Related 8-dot kantenji patterns

In the Japanese kantenji braille, the standard 8-dot Braille patterns 356, 1356, 3456, and 13456 are the patterns related to Braille pattern dots-245, since the two additional dots of kantenji patterns 0245, 2457, and 02457 are placed above the base 6-dot cell, instead of below, as in standard 8-dot braille.

Kantenji using braille patterns 356, 1356, 3456, or 13456

This listing includes kantenji using Braille pattern dots-245 for all 6349 kanji found in JIS C 6226-1978.

  - 十

Variants and thematic compounds

  -  ろ/十 + selector 2  =  鹵
  -  ろ/十 + selector 4  =  才
  -  selector 4 + ろ/十  =  辰

Compounds of 十

  -  れ/口 + ろ/十  =  古
  -  囗 + ろ/十  =  固
  -  氷/氵 + 囗 + ろ/十  =  凅
  -  に/氵 + 囗 + ろ/十  =  涸
  -  や/疒 + 囗 + ろ/十  =  痼
  -  か/金 + 囗 + ろ/十  =  錮
  -  き/木 + ろ/十  =  枯
  -  く/艹 + ろ/十  =  苦
  -  ろ/十 + 宿  =  克
  -  ろ/十 + れ/口 + 宿  =  兢
  -  ろ/十 + 比 + し/巿  =  尅
  -  ろ/十 + 宿 + ぬ/力  =  剋
  -  な/亻 + れ/口 + ろ/十  =  估
  -  ふ/女 + れ/口 + ろ/十  =  姑
  -  る/忄 + れ/口 + ろ/十  =  怙
  -  に/氵 + れ/口 + ろ/十  =  沽
  -  す/発 + れ/口 + ろ/十  =  罟
  -  心 + れ/口 + ろ/十  =  葫
  -  せ/食 + れ/口 + ろ/十  =  醐
  -  む/車 + れ/口 + ろ/十  =  蛄
  -  え/訁 + れ/口 + ろ/十  =  詁
  -  ろ/十 + れ/口 + ろ/十  =  辜
  -  か/金 + れ/口 + ろ/十  =  鈷
  -  お/頁 + ろ/十  =  卒
  -  龸 + ろ/十  =  率
  -  む/車 + 龸 + ろ/十  =  蟀
  -  な/亻 + お/頁 + ろ/十  =  倅
  -  つ/土 + お/頁 + ろ/十  =  埣
  -  る/忄 + お/頁 + ろ/十  =  悴
  -  に/氵 + お/頁 + ろ/十  =  淬
  -  け/犬 + お/頁 + ろ/十  =  猝
  -  や/疒 + お/頁 + ろ/十  =  瘁
  -  む/車 + お/頁 + ろ/十  =  翠
  -  く/艹 + お/頁 + ろ/十  =  萃
  -  の/禾 + の/禾 + ろ/十  =  粹
  -  せ/食 + せ/食 + ろ/十  =  醉
  -  日 + ろ/十  =  早
  -  ま/石 + ろ/十  =  章
  -  さ/阝 + ろ/十  =  障
  -  心 + ま/石 + ろ/十  =  樟
  -  へ/⺩ + ま/石 + ろ/十  =  璋
  -  や/疒 + ま/石 + ろ/十  =  瘴
  -  せ/食 + ま/石 + ろ/十  =  鱆
  -  ろ/十 + を/貝  =  乾
  -  ろ/十 + か/金  =  幹
  -  に/氵 + ろ/十 + か/金  =  澣
  -  ろ/十 + と/戸  =  斡
  -  ろ/十 + ⺼  =  朝
  -  よ/广 + ろ/十 + ⺼  =  廟
  -  ろ/十 + む/車  =  翰
  -  に/氵 + ろ/十 + む/車  =  瀚
  -  ろ/十 + selector 4 + 囗  =  戟
  -  ろ/十 + 宿 + い/糹/#2  =  韓
  -  氷/氵 + 日 + ろ/十  =  覃
  -  に/氵 + 日 + ろ/十  =  潭
  -  ち/竹 + 日 + ろ/十  =  簟
  -  心 + 日 + ろ/十  =  蕈
  -  え/訁 + 日 + ろ/十  =  譚
  -  か/金 + 日 + ろ/十  =  鐔
  -  ろ/十 + め/目  =  直
  -  る/忄 + ろ/十 + め/目  =  悳
  -  の/禾 + ろ/十 + め/目  =  稙
  -  つ/土 + ろ/十 + め/目  =  埴
  -  め/目 + ろ/十 + め/目  =  矗
  -  ろ/十 + ゐ/幺  =  索
  -  み/耳 + ろ/十  =  聴
  -  み/耳 + み/耳 + ろ/十  =  聽
  -  selector 1 + よ/广 + ろ/十  =  廰
  -  よ/广 + よ/广 + ろ/十  =  廳
  -  ゆ/彳 + ろ/十  =  徳
  -  ね/示 + ろ/十  =  嚢
  -  氷/氵 + ろ/十  =  準
  -  氷/氵 + 氷/氵 + ろ/十  =  凖
  -  と/戸 + ろ/十  =  革
  -  す/発 + ろ/十  =  羈
  -  龸 + と/戸 + ろ/十  =  鞏
  -  え/訁 + と/戸 + ろ/十  =  鞫
  -  え/訁 + ろ/十  =  計
  -  ひ/辶 + ろ/十  =  辻
  -  ひ/辶 + ろ/十 + に/氵  =  逑
  -  か/金 + ろ/十  =  針
  -  ろ/十 + よ/广  =  世
  -  に/氵 + ろ/十 + よ/广  =  泄
  -  心 + ろ/十 + よ/广  =  笹
  -  い/糹/#2 + ろ/十 + よ/广  =  紲
  -  ろ/十 + ぬ/力  =  協
  -  ろ/十 + て/扌  =  博
  -  selector 1 + ろ/十 + て/扌  =  愽
  -  ゑ/訁 + ろ/十  =  訊
  -  は/辶 + ろ/十  =  迅
  -  火 + 龸 + ろ/十  =  煢
  -  む/車 + selector 6 + ろ/十  =  蝨
  -  お/頁 + お/頁 + ろ/十  =  卆
  -  せ/食 + ろ/十  =  酔
  -  仁/亻 + お/頁 + ろ/十  =  伜
  -  の/禾 + ろ/十  =  粋
  -  き/木 + 宿 + ろ/十  =  枠
  -  ろ/十 + に/氵  =  求
  -  ろ/十 + 氷/氵  =  救
  -  ね/示 + ろ/十 + に/氵  =  裘
  -  日 + 宿 + ろ/十  =  皐
  -  な/亻 + 宿 + ろ/十  =  什
  -  れ/口 + 宿 + ろ/十  =  叶
  -  け/犬 + 宿 + ろ/十  =  夲
  -  こ/子 + 宿 + ろ/十  =  孛
  -  る/忄 + 宿 + ろ/十  =  悖
  -  に/氵 + 宿 + ろ/十  =  汁
  -  か/金 + う/宀/#3 + ろ/十  =  瓧
  -  ま/石 + 宿 + ろ/十  =  竍
  -  の/禾 + 宿 + ろ/十  =  籵
  -  い/糹/#2 + 宿 + ろ/十  =  隼
  -  ろ/十 + 龸 + せ/食  =  鴇
  -  ろ/十 + ゑ/訁  =  友
  -  み/耳 + ろ/十 + ゑ/訁  =  跋
  -  し/巿 + ろ/十 + ゑ/訁  =  黻
  -  の/禾 + ろ/十 + ゑ/訁  =  秡
  -  ろ/十 + つ/土  =  在
  -  る/忄 + ろ/十 + つ/土  =  恠
  -  ろ/十 + こ/子  =  存
  -  て/扌 + ろ/十 + こ/子  =  拵
  -  き/木 + ろ/十 + こ/子  =  栫
  -  く/艹 + ろ/十 + こ/子  =  荐
  -  ろ/十 + し/巿  =  布
  -  ろ/十 + ら/月  =  有
  -  ろ/十 + さ/阝  =  郁
  -  な/亻 + ろ/十 + ら/月  =  侑
  -  囗 + ろ/十 + ら/月  =  囿
  -  う/宀/#3 + ろ/十 + ら/月  =  宥
  -  さ/阝 + ろ/十 + ら/月  =  陏
  -  せ/食 + ろ/十 + ら/月  =  鮪
  -  宿 + ろ/十  =  宏
  -  氷/氵 + 宿 + ろ/十  =  浤
  -  い/糹/#2 + ろ/十  =  紘
  -  ろ/十 + い/糹/#2  =  雄
  -  ⺼ + 宿 + ろ/十  =  肱

Compounds of 鹵

  -  ん/止 + ろ/十  =  齢
  -  ん/止 + ん/止 + ろ/十  =  齡

Compounds of 才

  -  そ/馬 + ろ/十  =  豺
  -  を/貝 + ろ/十  =  財
  -  も/門 + ろ/十  =  閉
  -  ろ/十 + き/木  =  材
  -  け/犬 + ろ/十 + selector 4  =  犲

Compounds of 辰

  -  ふ/女 + ろ/十  =  娠
  -  て/扌 + ろ/十  =  振
  -  た/⽥ + ろ/十  =  農
  -  に/氵 + ろ/十  =  濃
  -  な/亻 + た/⽥ + ろ/十  =  儂
  -  ⺼ + た/⽥ + ろ/十  =  膿
  -  し/巿 + ろ/十  =  辱
  -  に/氵 + し/巿 + ろ/十  =  溽
  -  い/糹/#2 + し/巿 + ろ/十  =  縟
  -  こ/子 + し/巿 + ろ/十  =  耨
  -  く/艹 + し/巿 + ろ/十  =  蓐
  -  ね/示 + し/巿 + ろ/十  =  褥
  -  ち/竹 + ろ/十  =  震
  -  ろ/十 + れ/口  =  唇
  -  ろ/十 + ね/示  =  喪
  -  ろ/十 + お/頁  =  賑
  -  う/宀/#3 + selector 4 + ろ/十  =  宸
  -  日 + selector 4 + ろ/十  =  晨
  -  ⺼ + selector 4 + ろ/十  =  脣
  -  む/車 + 宿 + ろ/十  =  蜃

Other compounds

  -  ろ/十 + は/辶  =  半
  -  ろ/十 + ん/止  =  叛
  -  て/扌 + ろ/十 + は/辶  =  拌
  -  ⺼ + ろ/十 + は/辶  =  胖
  -  ね/示 + ろ/十 + は/辶  =  袢
  -  ろ/十 + ま/石  =  辛
  -  心 + ろ/十  =  梓
  -  心 + ろ/十 + ま/石  =  薛
  -  よ/广 + ろ/十  =  庁
  -  な/亻 + ろ/十  =  僚
  -  う/宀/#3 + ろ/十  =  寮
  -  火 + ろ/十  =  燎
  -  や/疒 + ろ/十  =  療
  -  め/目 + ろ/十  =  瞭
  -  て/扌 + 宿 + ろ/十  =  撩
  -  日 + 龸 + ろ/十  =  暸
  -  に/氵 + 龸 + ろ/十  =  潦
  -  ゐ/幺 + 宿 + ろ/十  =  繚
  -  ひ/辶 + 宿 + ろ/十  =  遼
  -  か/金 + 宿 + ろ/十  =  鐐
  -  ろ/十 + う/宀/#3 + せ/食  =  鷯
  -  ぬ/力 + ろ/十  =  勃
  -  に/氵 + ぬ/力 + ろ/十  =  渤
  -  仁/亻 + ろ/十  =  令
  -  へ/⺩ + ろ/十  =  玲
  -  な/亻 + 仁/亻 + ろ/十  =  伶
  -  囗 + 仁/亻 + ろ/十  =  囹
  -  る/忄 + 仁/亻 + ろ/十  =  怜
  -  そ/馬 + 仁/亻 + ろ/十  =  羚
  -  み/耳 + 仁/亻 + ろ/十  =  聆
  -  心 + 仁/亻 + ろ/十  =  苓
  -  む/車 + 仁/亻 + ろ/十  =  蛉
  -  ろ/十 + 宿 + せ/食  =  鴒
  -  ⺼ + ろ/十  =  肋
  -  ら/月 + ろ/十  =  臘
  -  む/車 + ろ/十  =  蝋
  -  け/犬 + ろ/十  =  猟
  -  け/犬 + け/犬 + ろ/十  =  獵
  -  か/金 + 龸 + ろ/十  =  鑞
  -  ろ/十 + 囗  =  再
  -  selector 1 + ろ/十 + 囗  =  冉
  -  く/艹 + ろ/十 + 囗  =  苒
  -  ろ/十 + そ/馬  =  牽
  -  ろ/十 + ひ/辶  =  飛

Notes

Braille patterns